Federico Mancinelli (born 8 May 1982) is an Argentine professional footballer who plays as a centre-back for Guillermo Brown.

Career
Mancinelli's senior footballing career began in 1998 with Tiro Federal, which preceded a move to Rosario Puerto Belgrano five years later. 2005 saw Mancinelli join Villa Mitre of Torneo Argentino A, he featured thirty times and scored two goals for the club as they won the title and promotion to 2006–07 Primera B Nacional. At the conclusion of 2005–06, Mancinelli was signed by fellow Primera B Nacional team Olimpo. Fifteen appearances later, Mancinelli were promoted to the Argentine Primera División after finishing top of the 2006–07 Primera B Nacional. In 2008, Mancinelli joined Mérida in Mexico's Primera División A.

For Mérida, Mancinelli made his debut on 4 October 2008 in a victory over Atlético Mexiquense. In the following April, he scored his first two goals for the club after netting twice against Querétaro in a 2–1 win. Four further goals followed in a total of sixty-seven matches over two years for Mérida. He left in 2010 but remained in Mexican football after signing for Atlante UTN. He went on to make seventeen appearances. He rejoined Olimpo in 2011 and subsequently made seventeen appearances in 2011–12. Huracán became Mancinelli's seventh senior club in July 2012 as he signed contract terms with the Primera B Nacional side.

In the following six seasons, Mancinelli played one hundred and thirty-two games for Huracán in Primera B Nacional and in the Argentine Primera División; following promotion in 2014. Shortly after, he was part of the Huracán squad which won the 2013–14 Copa Argentina and 2014 Supercopa Argentina. Huracán announced, in June 2019, that Mancinelli's contract wouldn't be renewed at the conclusion of 2018–19, bringing an end to his seven-year spell with the club. Mancinelli subsequently agreed a deal with Patronato. After nineteen matches for them, Mancinelli headed to Sarmiento in September 2020.

In January 2022, Mancinelli joined Primera Nacional club Guillermo Brown.

Career statistics
.

Honours
Villa Mitre
Torneo Argentino A: 2005–06

Olimpo
Primera B Nacional: 2006–07

Mérida
Primera División A: 2008–09 Clausura

Huracán
Copa Argentina: 2013–14
Supercopa Argentina: 2014

References

External links

1982 births
Living people
Sportspeople from Bahía Blanca
Argentine people of Italian descent
Argentine footballers
Association football defenders
Argentine expatriate footballers
Expatriate footballers in Mexico
Argentine expatriate sportspeople in Mexico
Torneo Argentino B players
Torneo Argentino A players
Primera Nacional players
Argentine Primera División players
Ascenso MX players
Villa Mitre footballers
Olimpo footballers
C.F. Mérida footballers
Toros Neza footballers
Club Atlético Huracán footballers
Club Atlético Patronato footballers
Club Atlético Sarmiento footballers
Guillermo Brown de Puerto Madryn footballers